Tiang may refer to:

Tiang language, Papua
Tiang (antelope), an African species

People with the surname Tiang include:

Jeremy Tiang (born 1977), Singaporean writer
Thomas A. S. Tiang, Malaysian architect